Maximiliano Emilio Faotto (born April 3, 1910, date of death unknown) was a Uruguayan football coach and player of Italian ancestry (see oriundo). He played in Italy in the 1930s and 1940s for Palermo, Lazio, Napoli and Ascoli.

He also served as player/manager for Palermo from 1945 to 1947. During the first season the rosanero played in a mixed post-war league made by Serie A and Serie B teams, in which he did not play any match. In the second season, Palermo took part in the Serie B and Faotto played 9 matches.

Sources
Enciclopedia del Calcio - Faotto  
RSSSF - Uruguayan players in Italy

1910 births
Year of death missing
Club Nacional de Football players
Racing Club de Montevideo players
Palermo F.C. players
S.S. Lazio players
S.S.C. Napoli players
Ascoli Calcio 1898 F.C. players
Palermo F.C. managers
Serie A players
Footballers from Montevideo
Uruguayan footballers
Uruguayan football managers
Association football defenders
Uruguayan sportspeople of Italian descent